Hans Arthur Gerard van Manen (born 11 July 1932) is a Dutch ballet dancer, choreographer and photographer.

He studied under Sonia Gaskell and Françoise Adret. Van Manen wrote many ballets. He worked for the Dutch National Ballet from 1973 to 1985.

Awards and decorations
Officer of the Order of Orange-Nassau (1992)
Deutscher Tanzpreis (1993)
Erasmus Prize (2000)
Prix Benois de la Danse (2005) for lifetime achievement
Commander of the Order of the Netherlands Lion (2007)

Hans van Manen Festival
The Hans van Manen Festival was dance festival staged by the Dutch National Ballet in Amsterdam in 2007 as a celebration of the 75th birthday of Hans van Manen.

Joining the Dutch National Ballet were guest artists from the Bayerisches Staatsballet, the Kirov Ballet and Nederlands Dans Theater. Performing during the gala event were ballerinas such as Uliana Lopatkina, Lucia Lacarra, Igone de Jongh and many others. The event took place at the Het Muziektheater, Amsterdam.

Works

Ole, Ole, la Margarita (1955)
Swing (1956)
Feestgericht (1957)
Pastorale d'Été (1958)
Mouvement Symphoniques (1958)
De Maan in de Trapeze (1959; music Benjamin Britten)
Klaar Af! (1960)
Concertino (1961)
Kaín en Abel (1961)
Eurydice (1962)
Voet bij Stuk (1962)
Symphony in Three Movements (1963; Igor Stravinsky)
Omnibus (1964)
Opus Twaalf (1964)
Repetitie (1965)
Essay in Stilte (1965)
Metaforen (1965; D. Lesur) 
Terugblik op Morgen (1966)
Point of no Return (1966)
Vijf Schetsen (1966; Paul Hindemith)
Ready Made (1967)
Dualis (1967)
Untitled (1968)
Variomatic (1968; Lennox Berkeley)
Three Pieces (1968)
Solo for voice 1 (1968)
Squares (1969; Z. Szilassy)
Situation (1970)
Mutations (1970)
Snippers (1970)
Twice (1970)
Grosse Fuge (1971; Ludwig van Beethoven)
Keep Going (1971)
Ajakaboembie (1971)
Tilt (1972)
Twilight (1972)
Opus Lemaitre (1972; J.S. Bach)
Daphnis en Chloë (1972; Maurice Ravel) 
Septet extra (1973)
Adagio Hammerklavier (1973)
Assortimento (1973)
Le Sacre du Printemps (1974; Igor Stravinsky)
Kwintet (1974)
Four Schumann Pieces (1975)
Noble et Sentimentale (1975)
Collective symphony (with Rudi van Dantzig and Toer van Schayk 1975; muziek Igor Stravinsky) 
Ebony Concerto en een Tango (1976)
Octet opus 20 (1977)
Lieder ohne Worte (1977)
5 Tango's (1977; Ástor Piazzolla)
Unisono (1978)
Dumbarton oaks (1978)
Premier Grand Trio (1978)
Memories of the Body (1979)
Live (1979)
Concerto voor piano en blazers (1979)
Einlage (1980)
Pianovariaties I (1980; J.S. Bach and Luigi Dallapiccola)
Izzy M. (1980)
Sarcasmen (1981; Sergei Prokofiev)
Five Short Stories (1982)
Trois Gnossiennes (1982; Erik Satie) 
Pose (1982; Claude Debussy) 
Portrait (1983)
In and Out (1983)
Exposed (1984; Claude Debussy)
Bits and Pieces (1984)
Nieuw programma (1985)
Balletscènes (1985; Igor Stravinsky)
In Korte Broek (1985)
Corps (1985)
In Concert (1986)
Opening (1986)
In the Future (1986)
Face (video) (1987)
Symphonieën der Nederlanden (1987)
Izzy en Olly in een Hemelbed (1987)
Clogs (1987)
Flags (1987)
Wet Desert (1987)
Shaker loops (1988; John Adams) 
The Sound of Music (1988)
Black Cake (1989)
Brainstorm (1989)
Visions fugitives (1990)
Intermezzo voor musici en dansers (1990)
Two (1990; Ferruccio Busoni)
Theme (1990)
Andante (1990; W.A. Mozart)
Evergreens (1991)
On the Move (1992)
Shorthand – Six Stravinsky Pieces (1993) 
Fantasia (1993; Busoni's adaptation of J.S. Bach)
Different Partners (1993)
Concertante (1994)
Compositie (1994)
Nacht (1994)
Polish pieces (1995)
Déjà vu (1995)
Kammerballet (1995) 
The Old Man and Me (1996) 
Kleines Requiem (1996)
Solo (1997)
Three pieces for HET (1997)
Couple (1998)
Zero Hour (1998)
Short Cut (1999)
Two Gold Variatons (1999)
Bach Pieces (2000)
Andante Festivo (2000)
Trilogie (2000)
Two Faces (2000)
Simple Things (2001)
Monologue, Dialogue (2003)
Sticky Piece (2003)
Frank Bridge Variations (2005; Benjamin Britten)
Six Piano Pieces (2006)
Dreaming About You (2006)
Tears (2008) part of In Space
Waterfront (2009)
Without Words (2010)
Variations for two couples (2012)
Dances with Harp (2014)
Alltag (2014)

References

External links

1932 births
Dutch choreographers
Dutch male ballet dancers
Dutch photographers
Dutch gay artists
Dutch LGBT entertainers
Dutch LGBT photographers
LGBT choreographers
Gay dancers
Living people
Officers of the Order of Orange-Nassau
People from Amstelveen
20th-century Dutch ballet dancers
Gay photographers